Leon Maurice Joe (born October 26, 1981) is a former professional gridiron football linebacker. He was drafted by the Chicago Bears in the fourth round of the 2004 NFL Draft. He played college football at Maryland.

Over the course of his National Football League (NFL) career, Joe also played for the Arizona Cardinals, Buffalo Bills, Jacksonville Jaguars, Tampa Bay Buccaneers, and Detroit Lions. He also spent time in the Canadian Football League (CFL) with both the Montreal Alouettes and Toronto Argonauts before retiring in 2010.

External links
Just Sports Stats
Buffalo Bills bio
Jacksonville Jaguars bio
Maryland Terrapins bio
Tampa Bay Buccaneers bio

1981 births
Living people
American football linebackers
American players of Canadian football
Arizona Cardinals players
Buffalo Bills players
Canadian football linebackers
Chicago Bears players
Detroit Lions players
Edmonton Elks players
Jacksonville Jaguars players
Maryland Terrapins football players
Montreal Alouettes players
Sportspeople from Xenia, Ohio
Players of American football from Ohio
Tampa Bay Buccaneers players
Toronto Argonauts players